Vlatko Gošev (born 10 September 1974) is a retired Macedonian football midfielder, who last played for Anagennisi Arta.

International career
He made his senior debut for Macedonia in a March 1996 friendly match against Malta in Prilep and has earned a total of 22 caps, scoring no goals. His final international was a February 1999 friendly against Albania.

References

External sources

1974 births
Living people
People from Vinica Municipality, Macedonia
Association football midfielders
Macedonian footballers
North Macedonia international footballers
FK Sileks players
FK Rabotnički players
FK Vardar players
PAS Giannina F.C. players
Levadiakos F.C. players
Anagennisi Arta F.C. players
Macedonian First Football League players
Super League Greece players
Football League (Greece) players
Macedonian expatriate footballers
Expatriate footballers in Greece
Macedonian expatriate sportspeople in Greece